Neocallotillus is a beetle genus in the family Cleridae, the checkered beetles.

 Names brought to synonymy
 Neocallotillus elegans (Erichson, 1847), a synonym for Callotillus elegans

References

External links

 Callotillus on www.discoverlife.org
 Callotillus on bugguide.net

Cleridae genera
Tillinae